16th & California and 16th & Stout stations (sometimes styled as 16th•California and 16th•Stout) are a pair of is an light rail stations in Downtown Denver, Colorado, United States. It is served by the D, H, and L lines, operated by the Regional Transportation District (RTD), and was opened on October 8, 1994. These stations have one track each, and are one city block apart. 16th & California is served only by northbound trains and 16th & Stout is served only by southbound trains. These stations serve the 16th Street Mall and provide connections to the MallRide shuttle bus and Union Station via the shuttles.

Gallery

References 

RTD light rail stations in Denver
Railway stations in the United States opened in 1994